IBA GROUP is an international IT company founded in 1993. The company’s focus areas include enterprise applications, mainframe systems, SAP solutions, cloud technologies, and RPA/ML solutions.

Since 2005, the head office has been located in Prague, Czech Republic. The company has offices in 15 countries and development centers in nine countries.

History 
IBA GROUP was founded in 1993, in Minsk, Belarus as a joint venture between IBM and local IT organizations. Since 1998, the company started opening international offices, such as IBA USA in Mountain View, California. In 1999, the IBA CZ development center was launched in Prague, Czech Republic, and the IBA Development office in Limassol, Cyprus. In 1999, IBM withdrew as a part owner of IBA, while remaining its major business partner. In 2000, the IBA IT GmbH office opened in Düsseldorf, Germany. 

In 2005, the head office of IBA Group was opened in Prague and at the same time IBA CZ office expanded to include a branch in Brno, Czech Republic. In 2006, IBA Group established the company IT Park in Minsk, Belarus. In 2010, an office was opened in Astana. In 2012, IBA Ukraine was opened in Kyiv,  and in 2013, IBA South Africa was established in Johannesburg.  In 2015, IBA Group opened offices in Bratislava, Slovakia, and Ostrava, Czech Republic. In 2017, IBA Group opened a development center in Bulgaria. In 2022, representative offices were opened in Georgia, Croatia,  Lithuania, and Serbia.

IBA GROUP developed a series of mobile payment solutions together with VISA. It developed a digital payment technology tapXphone which turns NFC-Android smartphone into a payment terminal. tapXphone was implemented in Ukraine, Kazakhstan, Moldova, Slovakia, Latvia, Azerbaijan, Greece, etc. In Ukraine, tapXphone cooperated with two largest banks — PrivatBank and Oshchadbank to create payment terminals.

References 

Companies based in Prague
Software_companies_established_in_1993